Alvin Curran (born December 13, 1938) is an American composer, performer, improviser, sound artist, and writer. He was born in Providence, Rhode Island, and lives and works in Rome, Italy. He is the co-founder, with Frederic Rzewski and Richard Teitelbaum, of Musica Elettronica Viva, and a former student of Elliott Carter. Curran's music often makes use of electronics and environmental found sounds. He was a professor of music at Mills College in California until 2006 and now teaches privately in Rome and sporadically at various institutions.

His works include solo performance pieces such as Endangered Species, TransDadaExpress, and Shofar; radio works such as Crystal Psalms, Un Altro Ferragosto, I Dreamt John Cage Yodeling at the Zurich Hauptbahnhof, and Living Room Music; large-scale musical choreographic works such as Oh Brass on the Grass Alas, for 300 amateur brass-band musicians, and the Maritime Rites series of performances on and near water; sound installation works such as Magic Carpet, Floor Plan, The Twentieth Century, and Gardening with John; chamber music such as For Cornelius for piano, the trio Schtyx, the string quartet VSTO, the saxophone quartet Electric Rags II, the percussion quartet THEME PARK, a series of works for chorus SATB, and the work for chamber orchestra and video Circus Maximus; The Book of Beginnings for orchestra, youth orchestra, self-playing pianos, and cellphone app; and many collaborative dance and theater works.

Since 1996, Curran has worked on Inner Cities, a growing series of solo piano pieces that together form one of the longest non-repetitive piano pieces ever written. Daniela Tortora has edited a book about his work, Alvin Curran Live in Roma (Die Schachtel 2010). In 2015 he published The Alvin Curran Fakebook, an atypical autobiography that includes photos, writings, and sketches alongside more than 200 scores and fragments ranging from raw sonic materials to conceptual musics and completed compositions. His articles have been published in the New York Times, Leonardo, The Contemporary Music Review, and Musiktexte, among others.

Selected discography

Songs and Views of the Magnetic Garden (1974 Ananda, reissue 1993) Catalyst Records
Fiori Chiari Fiori Oscuri (1975) Ananda No. 4
In Real Time (Ictus, 1978), with Evan Parker and Andrea Centazzo
The Works (1978) Fore
Canti Illuminati (1980 Fore, reissue 2004) Fringes Recordings
Natural History (1982) Editions Gianozzo
Maritime Rites, ten environmental concerts produced for National Public Radio (1984, reissue 2004) New World Records
Field It and Lenz (1985) Radio Art Foundation
For Cornelius and Era Ora (1986), Ursula Oppens, Frederic Rzewski pianos, New Albion
Electric Rags II (1989) New Albion Records, with Rova Saxophone Quartet
Hyper Beatles (1990) Aki Takahashi piano, Toshiba-EMI/Angel
Il Clarinetto (1992) David Keberle clarinet/Curran electronics, BMG Ariola
Schtyx (1994) Abel Steinberg Winant Trio, with VSTO (string quartet) David Abel, Sharon Wood, Meg Tichener, Dina Weinschelbaum, CRI.
Animal Behaviour (1995) Tzadik.
Yvar Mikhashoff plays Alvin Curran: Piano Works (1995) Mode Records
Theme Park (1998) Tzadik.
Crystal Psalms (1999) New World Records
riverrun: voicings/soundscapes (1999) Klaus Schöning, editor, WERGO
The Things In Between (1999) Eve Egoyan, piano, Artifact
Time Tracks (1999) Jeanne Golan, piano, Albany Records
Apollo and Marsyas, Het Apollohuis 1980–1997: An anthology of new music concerts (2002) ACD
Inner Cities (2003), Bruce Brubaker, piano, Arabesque Recordings
Lost Marbles (2004) Tzadik.
Our Ur (2004), with Domenico Sciajno, Rossbin Production
ABO: Un Ritratto Sonoro (2004) Companion to the book, Lezione di boxe by Achille Bonita Oliva, Luca Sossella
Vindobona Blues (2005) Kunstradio OR
Toto Angelica (2005) I Dischi di Angelica.
Hesitation-Tango (2005) Aki Takahashi, piano, Camerata
Inner Cities (2005)  Daan Vandewalle, piano, Long Distance Records
The Art of the Fluke (2007), with Cenk Ergün, TEAR Records
Hope Street Tunnel Blues (2007) Bruce Brubaker, piano, Arabesque Recordings
 For Cornelius, Kees Wieringa, Do Records
The Stroke That Kills (2008) Seth Josel, guitar, New World Records
The Magic Carpet (2008), reissue of 1971 LP on SOURCE, music of the avant garde: Source Records 1–6, 1968–1971, Pogus Productions
Endangered Species (2010), ATOPOS Records
Under the Fig Tree/The Magic Carpet (2010), Die Schachtel
Alvin Curran:  Solo Works – the '70s (2010), 3-CD set, New World Records
MMM Quartet – Live At The Metz' Arsenal (2012), with Joelle Leandre, Fred Frith, Urs Leimgruber, Leo Records
Shofar Rags (2013) Tzadik
 Inner Cities 8, Eve Egoyan, (2014) Other Minds Records
 On Hearing the Brooklyn Bridge Sing in Yiddish (2016),SWR Digital
 Natural History (2017), Black Truffle
 The Irrawaddy Blues (2017), Documenta 14
 From The Alvin Curran Fakebook: The Biella Sessions (2017), Dodicilune

Discography with Musica Elettronica Viva
Friday (2008) reissue of 1969 Polydor LP by Alga Marghen
Spacecraft/Unified Patchwork Theory (2001) Alga Marghen
apogee – MEV/AMM (2005) Matchless Recordings
MEV40 (2008) 4-CD set with 40 years of music, New World Records
AMM/MEV: Live Electronic Music Improvised (2009) reissue of 1968 Mainstream LP by WERGO

Sources

https://www.nytimes.com/2016/05/15/opinion/sunday/the-trombone-comes-home.html?_r=0

External links
 Site features numerous musical excerpts
Waking Up to Alvin Curran, Frank J. Oteri
Curran discusses composing in modern world

1938 births
20th-century classical composers
21st-century classical composers
American male classical composers
American classical composers
American experimental musicians
Jewish American classical composers
Living people
Pupils of Elliott Carter
Mills College faculty
Tzadik Records artists
21st-century American composers
20th-century American composers
20th-century American male musicians
21st-century American male musicians
21st-century American Jews